Talitha Eliana Bateman (born September 4, 2001) is an American actress. After making her acting debut in a 2013 episode of the sitcom The Middle, she has starred in the independent drama film So B. It (2016), the science fiction film The 5th Wave (2016), the supernatural horror film Annabelle: Creation (2017), the disaster film Geostorm (2017), the romantic comedy film Love, Simon (2018), and the horror film Countdown (2019).

Personal life 
Bateman was born in Turlock, California. She followed her elder sister to Los Angeles to start auditioning for roles. She is home schooled.
She currently lives in southern California. Talitha is the youngest girl of eight children
and the second youngest child overall; her younger brother Gabriel Bateman is also an actor.

Career 
Bateman's first screen appearance was on television, in a small role during a 2013 episode of the ABC sitcom The Middle. She appeared in the pilot episodes of Maker Shack Agency and Mamma Dallas, neither of which went to series. In 2015, Bateman appeared in three episodes of The CW's comedy-drama series Hart of Dixie, playing the recurring role of Scarlett Kincaid during the fourth season.

On film, Bateman played Kayla in the science fiction horror film The Hive, which premiered at Fantastic Fest in September 2014. She played Teacup in the science fiction film The 5th Wave and Nicole in the comedy film Nine Lives, both of which were released in 2016.

Bateman played the lead character of Heidi DeMuth in the independent drama film So B. It, which was produced in 2015 and was picked up for release in 2017. Also that year, she played the title role of Janice / Annabelle Higgins in the supernatural horror prequel film Annabelle: Creation and as Hannah Lawson in the science fiction disaster film Geostorm.

In 2018, she starred as Nora Spier in the romantic comedy film Love, Simon, alongside Jennifer Garner, who she also co-starred with in Nine Lives. In 2019, she appeared in the supernatural horror film Countdown (2019), starring alongside Elizabeth Lail and Jordan Calloway

Filmography

Film

Television

Accolades

References

External links 
 

2001 births
Living people
American child actresses
American film actresses
American television actresses
21st-century American actresses
Place of birth missing (living people)